Gontarski is a surname. Notable people with the surname include:

 Steven Gontarski (born 1972), American sculptor
 S. E. Gontarski (born 1942), professor of English at Florida State University